

140001–140100 

|-id=038
| 140038 Kurushima ||  || Kurushima Kaikyo is a 4-kilometer-wide strait between the islands of Shikoku and Oshima, Japan || 
|}

140101–140200 

|-bgcolor=#f2f2f2
| colspan=4 align=center | 
|}

140201–140300 

|-bgcolor=#f2f2f2
| colspan=4 align=center | 
|}

140301–140400 

|-bgcolor=#f2f2f2
| colspan=4 align=center | 
|}

140401–140500 

|-bgcolor=#f2f2f2
| colspan=4 align=center | 
|}

140501–140600 

|-bgcolor=#f2f2f2
| colspan=4 align=center | 
|}

140601–140700 

|-id=602
| 140602 Berlind ||  || Andreas Berlind (born 1972), American astronomer with the Sloan Digital Sky Survey || 
|-id=620
| 140620 Raoulwallenberg ||  || Raoul Wallenberg (1912–1947), Swedish humanitarian who saved tens of thousands of Jewish lives in Hungary during World War II || 
|-id=628
| 140628 Klaipeda ||  || The city of Klaipeda in Lithuania. Founded in 1252 and known by its old German name "Memel", it is the country's third largest city. || 
|}

140701–140800 

|-bgcolor=#f2f2f2
| colspan=4 align=center | 
|}

140801–140900 

|-bgcolor=#f2f2f2
| colspan=4 align=center | 
|}

140901–141000 

|-id=980
| 140980 Blanton ||  || Michael Blanton (born 1973), American cosmologist with the Sloan Digital Sky Survey || 
|}

References 

140001-141000